The 2019 Wuhan Open (also known as the 2019 Dongfeng Motor Wuhan Open for sponsorship reasons) was a women's tennis tournament played on outdoor hard courts between September 22–28, 2019. It was the 6th edition of the Wuhan Open, and part of the WTA Premier 5 tournaments of the 2019 WTA Tour. The tournament was held at the Optics Valley International Tennis Center in Wuhan, China.

Points and prize money

Point distribution

Prize money

Singles main-draw entrants

Seeds

 Rankings are as of September 16, 2019

Other entrants
The following players received wild cards into the singles main draw:
  Peng Shuai
  Elena Rybakina
  Samantha Stosur
  Wang Xiyu
  Venus Williams

The following players received entry from the singles qualifying draw:
  Jennifer Brady
  Lauren Davis
  Kateryna Kozlova
  Veronika Kudermetova
  Svetlana Kuznetsova
  Christina McHale
  Bernarda Pera
  Zhu Lin

The following players received entry as lucky losers:
  Ons Jabeur
  Rebecca Peterson
  Tamara Zidanšek

Withdrawals
Before the tournament
  Bianca Andreescu → replaced by  Tamara Zidanšek
  Victoria Azarenka → replaced by  Ons Jabeur
  Julia Görges → replaced by  Kristina Mladenovic
  Madison Keys → replaced by  Rebecca Peterson
  Anett Kontaveit → replaced by  Camila Giorgi
  Maria Sakkari → replaced by  Marie Bouzková
  Carla Suárez Navarro → replaced by  Aliaksandra Sasnovich
  Lesia Tsurenko → replaced by  Jessica Pegula
  Markéta Vondroušová → replaced by  Wang Yafan
  Zheng Saisai → replaced by  Polona Hercog

Retirements
  Lauren Davis (lower back injury)
  Camila Giorgi (right wrist injury)
  Simona Halep (lower back injury)
  Yulia Putintseva (left ankle injury)

Doubles main-draw entrants

Seeds

 Rankings are as of September 16, 2019

Other entrants
The following pairs received wildcards into the doubles main draw:
  Kiki Bertens /  Lesley Pattinama Kerkhove
  Caroline Garcia /  Bethanie Mattek-Sands
  Tang Qianhui /  Wang Xinyu

Withdrawals
During the tournament
  Simona Halep (lower back injury)

Champions

Singles

  Aryna Sabalenka def.  Alison Riske, 6–3, 3–6, 6–1

Doubles

  Duan Yingying /  Veronika Kudermetova def.  Elise Mertens /  Aryna Sabalenka, 7–6(7–3), 6–2

References

External links
 Official website

 
Wuhan Open
2019 in Chinese women's sport
Wuhan Open
2019 in Chinese tennis